Allium brevistylum is a plant species native to the western United States. It grows in meadows and along stream banks high in the mountains of Colorado, Utah, Wyoming, Montana and Idaho, at elevations of 2200–3400 m.

Allium brevistylum produces a thick, Iris-like underground rhizome, at the ends of which are bulbs up to 3 cm in diameter. Scapes are up to 60 cm tall, flattened and with narrow wings. Flowers are urn-shaped, up to 15 mm long; tepals pink with thick midribs; anthers and pollen yellow.

References

brevistylum
Flora of the Rocky Mountains
Flora of Colorado
Flora of Wyoming
Flora of Montana
Flora of Idaho
Flora of Utah
Endemic flora of the United States
Onions
Plants described in 1871
Taxa named by Sereno Watson